Margaret Campbell (1883–1939) was an American character actress in silent films.

Margaret Campbell may also refer to:
 Lady Margaret Campbell (fl. 16th century), wife of John Erskine, 5th Lord Erskine
 Margaret W. Campbell (1827–1908), American suffragist
 Margaret Campbell (1888–1952), British novelist who wrote mainly as Marjorie Bowen
 Margaret Menzies Campbell (1893–1990), Scottish surgeon and general practitioner
 Margaret Campbell, Duchess of Argyll (1912–1993), socialite, spendthrift and libertine
 Margaret Campbell (politician) (1912–1999), Canadian politician
 Margaret Campbell (athlete), in the 1980 Central American and Caribbean Junior Championships in Athletics